A Very Special Christmas 7 is a collection of Christmas songs covered by current artists. The compilation album is the seventh in the A Very Special Christmas series of albums. The album was released on November 23, 2009, and proceeds from the sales benefited the Special Olympics.

This edition returns to the original format of including artists from a wide range of musical styles, including genres from reggae fusion (Sean Kingston) to country (Kellie Pickler). It peaked at #116 in December 2009 Billboard album chart.

Track listing
"Have Yourself A Merry Little Christmas" by Colbie Caillat
"Let It Snow" by Carter Twins
"Rockin' Around The Christmas Tree" by Miley Cyrus
"Winter Wonderland" by Vanessa Hudgens
"Little Drummer Boy" by Sean Kingston
"The Christmas Song" by Charice
"Do You Hear What I Hear" by Kristinia DeBarge
"Jingle Bell Rock" by Mitchel Musso
"Christmas (Baby Please Come Home)" by Leighton Meester
"Santa Baby" by Kellie Pickler
"Hark! The Herald Angels Sing" by Carrie Underwood
"Last Christmas" by Ashley Tisdale
"Silent Night" by Gloriana

References

External links
A Very Special Christmas 7 at A Very Special Christmas Official Website
A Very Special Christmas Official Website
A Very Special Christmas Article at SpecialOlympics.org
A Very Special Christmas 7 at Amazon.com

2009 Christmas albums
2009 compilation albums
A&M Records compilation albums
A Very Special Christmas